Salman Mohammed Mohammed Al-Faraj (born 1 August 1989) is a Saudi Arabian professional footballer who plays as a midfielder and captains both Saudi Professional League club Al-Hilal and the Saudi Arabia national team.

Club career
He is one-club man of Al Hilal.

International career
Salman's first match with his national team was against Congo in an international friendly at Prince Abdullah bin Jalawi Stadium in al-Hasa, Saudi Arabia on 14 October 2012. The match ended in a 3–2 win. Salman's first goal with his national team was against Timor-Leste during the second round of the 2018 World Cup qualifiers at King Abdullah Sports City, in Jeddah, Saudi Arabia on 3 September 2015. The match ended in a 7–0 win.

In May 2018, he was named in Saudi Arabia’s preliminary squad for the 2018 World Cup in Russia. On 4 June, Salman included in 23-man squad for the World Cup. On 25 June, Salman scored the equalizing goal and his first ever World Cup goal from the penalty kick in a 2–1 victory over Egypt in their last group stage match of the tournament; it was Saudi Arabia's lone win in the tournament as the team crashed out of the group stage.

Career statistics

Club

International
Statistics accurate as of match played 22 November 2022.

International goals
Scores and results list Saudi Arabia's goal tally first.

Honours
Al-Hilal
Saudi Professional League: 2009–10, 2010–11, 2016–17, 2017–18, 2019–20, 2020–21, 2021–22
King Cup of Champions: 2015, 2017, 2019–20
Saudi Crown Prince Cup: 2008–09, 2009–10, 2010–11, 2011–12, 2012–13, 2015–16
Saudi Super Cup: 2015, 2018, 2021
 AFC Champions League: 2019, 2021

References

External links

Saudi League Profile

1989 births
Living people
People from Medina
Association football midfielders
Saudi Arabian footballers
Al Hilal SFC players
Saudi Professional League players
Saudi Arabia youth international footballers
Saudi Arabia international footballers
2015 AFC Asian Cup players
2018 FIFA World Cup players
Olympic footballers of Saudi Arabia
Footballers at the 2020 Summer Olympics
2022 FIFA World Cup players